The Tsaidam Lake Coal Mine (swampy lake) is a coal mine being developed in the Bayan sum of Töv aimag in central Mongolia.

The mine has coal reserves amounting to 6.8 billion tonnes of brown coal.

References 

Coal mines in Mongolia